Herding cats may refer to:
 An idiom denoting a futile attempt to control or organize a class of entities which are inherently uncontrollable—as in the difficulty of attempting to command individual cats into a group (herd).
 Cat Herders, a commercial from Electronic Data Systems, also known as Herding Cats (commercial)
 Herding Cats: A Life in Politics, a 2005 book written by United States Senator Trent Lott
 Herding Cats (album) (1999), the second album by the band Gaelic Storm
 Herding Cats, a play by Lucinda Coxon
 Herding Cats, a book by Graeme Davies, metallurgist and university administrator
 Herding Cats: Multiparty Mediation in a Complex World, a book by Chester Crocker, diplomat
 Herding Cats: A "Sarah's Scribbles" Collection, a book by Sarah Andersen, cartoonist

See also
 Herd mentality, describes how people are influenced by their peers to adopt certain behaviors
 Herd (disambiguation)